Indian Hill may refer to:
Indian Hill Cemetery, a cemetery in Middletown, Connecticut
 Indian Hill (Metra), a commuter railroad station in Winnetka, Illinois
 Indian Hill, Indiana, an unincorporated community
 Indian Hill (Edmonson County, Kentucky), a summit in Edmonson County, Kentucky
 Indian Hill (Massachusetts), a peak on Marthas Vineyard in Massachusetts
 Indian Hill (Minnesota), a peak in the Leaf Mountains of west-central Minnesota
 Indian Hill, Ohio, a suburb of Cincinnati, Ohio
 Indian Hill, Amador County, California, a place in California
 Indian Hill, Imperial County, California, a place in California
 Indian Hill (Lanfair Buttes), southernmost of the Lanfair Buttes, in San Bernardino County, California.
 Indian Hill (arts center), a now-defunct summer art and music camp in western Massachusettes.
 Indian Hill, a mountain in Judith Basin County, Montana
 Indian Hill, a mountain in Lake County, Montana
 Indian Hill, a mountain in McCone County, Montana

See also
 Indian Hills (disambiguation)
 Indian Hill-North Village
 Tumulus, or Indian mound